Ismail Kurban Husein Poonawala (born January 7, 1937) is an Indian professor of Arabic at the University of California, Los Angeles (UCLA), Department of Near Eastern Languages and Cultures (NELC) of over 30 years. Poonawala was born in 1937 in Godhra, India.  He is a specialist in Ismaili studies. 
Professor Poonawala's formal education includes M.A.s from University of Mumbai and Cairo along with a  Ph.D. from UCLA.

Bibliography
 The Pillars of Islam: Volume I: Ibadat: Acts of Devotion and Religious Observances (2002), .
 The Pillars of Islam: Volume II: Mu'amalat: Laws  Pertaining to Human Intercourse (2004), .

References

External links
 

Living people
Dawoodi Bohras
Indian Ismailis
American Ismailis
Cairo University alumni
University of California, Los Angeles faculty
University of California, Los Angeles alumni
1937 births
20th-century Ismailis
21st-century Ismailis
Gujarati people